Tabriz railway station is a structure in Tabriz, Iran; the current building was built during second Pahlavi era. The current building of Tabriz Railway Station is jointly design by French architect Fernand Pouillon and Iranian architect Heydar Ghiaï-Chamlou and built in 1950s.

History
The first railroad arriving to Tabriz had been built by Russians during the height of World War I. The first train arrived to Tabriz in March 1916 from Jolfa. The railway stretched from Tabriz to Tehran in 1958 with a length of 748 km.

Service summary
Note: Classifications are unofficial and only to best reflect the type of service offered on each path
Meaning of Classifications:
Local Service: Services originating from a major city, and running outwards, with stops at all stations
Regional Service: Services connecting two major centres, with stops at almost all stations
InterRegio Service: Services connecting two major centres, with stops at major and some minor stations
InterRegio-Express Service:Services connecting two major centres, with stops at major stations
InterCity Service: Services connecting two (or more) major centres, with no stops in between, with the sole purpose of connecting said centres.

References

External links

Architecture in Iran
Buildings and structures in Tabriz
Railway stations in Iran
Transportation in East Azerbaijan Province
Transport in Tabriz
Heydar Ghiai buildings and structures